Pop Player (formerly Pop Fun TV) is a British kids video-on-demand service aimed for preschoolers and for ages 7 and over, owned by Narrative Entertainment UK Limited.

History

As the Pop Fun TV app 
The service originally launched as Pop Fun TV which was a Sony Pictures Television owned YouView app in 2017 exclusive to YouView devices only. It contained content from Pop, Tiny Pop and the defunct Kix channel. It was also available on PlayStation 4 between 2019 and 2021.

As Pop Player 
In 2020, the app was rebranded as Pop Player and it was made available on Freeview Play and Freesat. However, the app was shutdown on PlayStation 4 in 2021 for an unknown reason.

In early 2022, a Pop Max live stream was added due to Pokémon taking over Pop Max. On 25 May 2022, Pop Player was added to Freeview channel 208 to replace Pop Max.

Availability 
The service is available on Freeview Play, YouView, Freesat, and Freeview channel 208. The service is also available on Android devices through the Google Play Store and on Apple devices through the App Store. The app was previously available on the PlayStation 4 sometime between 2019 and 2021 but, as of 2022, the app is no longer available to download.

Programming and activities 

The service provides hours of kids content and activities such as an art pad for kids and competitions from Pop, Tiny Pop, and Pop Max (formerly Kix). It also has a Pop Max livestream which is exclusive to Freeview Play.

References

External links 
 https://www.popfun.co.uk/artpad/

Children's television channels in the United Kingdom
Streaming television